Ruth Ann Palumbo (born July 7, 1949) is the longest-serving woman in the Kentucky House of Representatives and has represented District 76, which covers downtown Lexington, Kentucky and eastern Fayette County, since 1991. Palumbo is a member of the Kentucky Democratic Party.

Through her career, Palumbo has pushed for legislation concerning "more thorough investigations of child sexual abuse; Kentucky's compliance with the Americans with Disabilities Act [...]; and sponsorship of bills to protect the elderly in nursing homes," as well as bills to do with women's health, mammogram access, and healthcare in general.

Politics 
In 1998, Palumbo helped pass the Women's Health Act of 1998, which brought reconstructive mastectomies after breast cancer under coverage of medical insurance, as it previously had been considered cosmetic.

In the 2000s, Palumbo began caucusing with other female legislators (including included Joni Jenkins, Susan Johns, Eleanor Jordan, Mary Lou Marzian, Kathy Stein, and more) to track legislation in their individual fields of expertise and work together to affect legislation more easily than they could have done alone. One early victory involved "building statewide opposition to a bill that, before their organized effort, likely would have gone unnoticed and passed easily, [...] removing the requirement that educational institutions offer women's softball as well as men's baseball, violating the spirit if not the letter of Title IX."

In 2011, Palumbo became the longest-serving female member of the body.

During the 2009, 2013, and 2015 legislative sessions, Palumbo chaired the Economic Development Committee. Palumbo has formerly chaired the House's Economic Development and Workforce Investment Committee and co-chaired the Task Force on Economic Development.

Personal life 
During her youth, Palumbo thought about becoming a missionary but now considers her political work her mission. She attended Bryan Station High School before earning a Bachelor of Arts in Education from the University of Kentucky in 1972, and served as the President of the Fayette County Young Democrats from 1973-1974 and as the Treasurer of the Kentucky Young Democrats the same year. She once received a fellowship from the University of Kentucky, and she was President of the Lexington Philharmonic Women's Guild as well as being a board member of the Interdisciplinary Human Development Institute at the University of Kentucky. In 1988, she participated in Leadership Lexington.

Awards 
Palumbo was named Lexington's Outstanding Young Woman in 1982 and received the Governors Volunteer Activist Award in 1989.

References

External links
Ruth Ann Palumbo Official Website
Commonwealth of Kentucky House of Representatives - Ruth Ann Palumbo
Project Vote Smart - Representative Ruth Ann Palumbo (MT) profile
Follow the Money - Ruth Ann Palumbo
2008 2006 2004 2002 2000 1998 1996 1994 campaign contributions

Democratic Party members of the Kentucky House of Representatives
1949 births
Living people
University of Kentucky alumni
Women state legislators in Kentucky
21st-century American politicians
21st-century American women politicians